UFC 77: Hostile Territory was a mixed martial arts event held by the Ultimate Fighting Championship (UFC). The event took place on Saturday, October 20, 2007, at the U.S. Bank Arena in Cincinnati, Ohio.

Background
The main event featured Anderson Silva defending his Middleweight Championship against Cincinnati native and former champion Rich Franklin in a rematch of their October 2006 meeting at UFC 64, which Silva won by technical knockout. The name "Hostile Territory" came from the defense of Anderson Silva's UFC middleweight title against Cincinnati native Rich Franklin.

The co-main event was a heavyweight match-up between former two-time Heavyweight Champion Tim Sylvia and undefeated Brandon Vera.

Before the Vera vs. Sylvia fight, former amateur wrestler and WWE wrestler Brock Lesnar announced he had signed with the UFC.

The scores for the Black vs. Grice match were initially announced as 29–28 for Black, 29–28 for Grice, and 28–28, and the bout was ruled a split draw. An announcement was then made in the arena that the scores had been miscalculated and Grice was awarded the victory.

Results

Bonus awards
At the end of this event, $40,000 was awarded to each of the fighters who received one of these three awards.
 Fight of the Night: Matt Grice vs. Jason Black
 Knockout of the Night: Anderson Silva
 Submission of the Night: Demian Maia

See also
 Ultimate Fighting Championship
 List of UFC champions
 List of UFC events
 2007 in UFC

References

External links
 UFC 77 results at Sherdog.com
 UFC 77 official website

Ultimate Fighting Championship events
Events in Cincinnati
2007 in mixed martial arts
Mixed martial arts in Ohio
Sports competitions in Cincinnati
2007 in sports in Ohio